J8, J08, J 8 or J-8 may refer to :

 J8 (TV show), an Algerian comedic television show broadcast on Echourouk TV
 Jeep J8, a military vehicle based on the Jeep Wrangler platform
 Shenyang J-8, a high-speed, high-altitude Chinese-built single-seat interceptor fighter aircraft
 Junkers J 8, the internal designation for the 1917 German CL.I ground-attack aircraft 
 DSER Class J8, a Dublin and South Eastern Railway Irish steam locomotive 
  / , a 1940 British then Canadian 
 Malaysia Federal Route J8, a major road in Johor, Malaysia
 S/2000 J 8, a former name for Megaclite, a natural satellite of Jupiter
 S/2001 J 8, a former name for Kale, a retrograde irregular satellite of Jupiter
 S/2003 J 8, a former name for Hegemone, a natural satellite of Jupiter
 Samsung Galaxy J8, a smartphone made by Samsung.
 Johnson solid J8, the elongated square pyramid

and also :
 Junior 8, a junior global summit
 Berjaya Air IATA airline designator 
 Saint Vincent and the Grenadines aircraft registration code
 J 8, a Swedish designation for the 1937 Gloster Gladiator fighter aircraft
 J8, the Scrabble tile of which there is only one in each game set.
 J-8, the Joint Force Structure, Resources, & Assessment Directorate of the Joint Chiefs of Staff

See also
8J (disambiguation)